LGBI may refer to:
 Lokpriya Gopinath Bordoloi International Airport, northeastern India
 Local Government Board for Ireland (1872–1922)
 "Lesbian, gay, bisexual, and intersex"; see Intersex and LGBT